Belarus at the European Track Championships is an overview of the results from Belarus at the European Track Championships. Since 2001 there are the European Track Championships for under-23 and junior riders and since 2010 the European Track Championships for elite riders. Note that the under-23 and junior championships before 2010 also included omnium elite events.

European Track Championships (elite) 2010-current

Medalists 
This a list of medals won at the UEC European Track Championships for elite riders from 2010 to current.

Medals by year

European Track Championships (under-23 & junior) 2001-current 

Below is an overview of the Dutch results at the European Track Championships for under-23 and junior riders. Note that these championships also had a few elite events.

Medals by year

See also

 Great Britain at the European Track Championships
 Netherlands at the European Track Championships

Cycle racing in Belarus
Nations at the European Track Championships